The Lackawanna Cut-Off Restoration Project is a New Jersey Transit and Amtrak effort to restore passenger service to the Lackawanna Cut-Off in northwest New Jersey.

Service from Andover to Hoboken Terminal and New York Penn Station is to begin in 2026. Service to the latter will require full dual-mode electro-diesel locomotives because the North River Tunnels cannot accommodate diesel engines.

Future phases could rebuild the tracks on the remainder of the Cut-Off and extend service into northeastern Pennsylvania, possibly as far as Scranton. A 2020 Amtrak service expansion map, updated in May 2021, included service to Scranton, and is currently under study.

Operations (1908–79)

Built between 1908 and 1911 by the Delaware, Lackawanna & Western Railroad (DL&W) to speed service between Hoboken, New Jersey, and Buffalo, New York, the  Lackawanna Cut-Off was the last main line built in New Jersey. The line was considered an engineering marvel—a "super-railroad", in the vernacular of the day—with deep cuts, tall fills, and two large viaducts that allowed a mostly straight route through the mountains of the state's northwest region.  Although the DL&W was profitable during its corporate life, competition from trucks and other economic pressures after World War II forced it to merge with competitor Erie Railroad to form the Erie Lackawanna Railroad (EL) in 1960.

The EL initially shifted most freight traffic away from the Cut-Off, though it continued to run passenger trains over the line. The railroad's flagship passenger train, the Phoebe Snow, traveled via the Cut-Off until it was discontinued in November 1966, and the last regularly scheduled passenger train (the Lake Cities) ran over the line on January 5-6, 1970.  After May 8, 1974, freight traffic was revived on the line after the closure of a key junction with the Penn Central in Maybrook, New York, caused by fire damage to the ex-New York, New Haven and Hartford Railroad Poughkeepsie Bridge. But the conveyance of EL into Conrail on April 1, 1976, gave Conrail excess east–west trackage, and service on the Cut-Off ended in January 1979. (Conrail officials later said they might not have abandoned the Scranton Route, including the Cut-Off, if the EL had not severed a section of the Boonton Branch near Paterson, New Jersey, in the early 1960s for the construction of Interstate 80.)

Early preservation efforts (1979–86)
Efforts to preserve the Cut-Off began almost immediately upon the route's closing. In November 1979, Amtrak operated an inspection train between Hoboken and Scranton to investigate intercity rail service between the two cities. Dubbed the "Pocono Mountain Special", the train left Hoboken and ran west on the Morristown Line on November 13, 1979, reaching Port Morris shortly after 9 a.m. With the main line severed at Port Morris Junction, the special train detoured through Port Morris Yard, ran over Port Morris Wye, and then rolled onto the Cut-Off. The train ran to Scranton, where it was met by a group of political dignitaries. It was the last passenger train in the twentieth century—and the only Amtrak train—to operate over the entire route. The idea of Hoboken–Scranton service faded as Amtrak faced funding shortfalls and the need for significant track and station repairs in order to run passenger service on the line.

The  inspection trip marked the end of one era, and the beginning of another: a 40-plus-year effort to save and then reactivate the Cut-Off.  In the beginning, finding an operator for the line was less pressing than preserving the track and right-of-way itself. Several attempts were made to purchase the line from Conrail, which was concerned that a competitor might try to restore freight service on the route. The Sussex County Freeholder Board in New Jersey pursued such a purchase.

The Monroe County Railroad Authority in Pennsylvania also got involved, and nearly reached a deal to buy the  section of track between Port Morris and Scranton for $6.5 million. The railroad authority would have borrowed $4.1 million from the federal government at 3.25 percent per annum and issued bonds to cover the rest of the purchase price plus additional unspecified costs to restore the line. The agreement stipulated that the railroad operator would repay the loan from operational revenue.

In spite of initial optimism, the deal began to fall apart, and on August 10, 1983, the U.S. Department of Transportation informed Monroe County officials that the federal loan guarantee had been revoked and would instead go to the financially ailing Detroit & Mackinac Railway in Michigan. Monroe County officials continued to press their case, hoping that Congress would provide financial support; the railroad authority invited 16 potential operators to submit proposals, and seven did so on August 26, 1983. Meanwhile, the federal regulations surrounding the abandonment of railroad lines changed; instead of a lengthy regulatory process that had discouraged railroads from abandoning unwanted routes, the Interstate Commerce Commission (ICC) would be allowed to approve the abandonment of any track if it were not in service and had no originating or terminating shipments for two years, and was not required to serve any other track. This allowed Conrail to abandon the Cut-Off almost immediately. Atlantic City gambling interests also opposed restoring rail service over the Cut-Off, fearing renewed passenger service would provide a "Gambler's Express" to not-as-yet-built casinos in the Poconos that might compete with the nascent casinos of the Jersey Shore. A New Jersey Department of Transportation (NJDOT) priority list of rail projects at the time listed the Cut-Off as Number 26 in a list of unfunded capital projects.

The Monroe County Railroad Authority continued to fight Conrail, with support from PennDOT and the somewhat bizarre threat to use a privately owned World War II tank to block any Conrail rail-removal train.  Conrail eventually relented and agreed not to sever the line between Slateford and Scranton.

Track removal

With all regulatory and political hurdles removed in New Jersey, however, Conrail began lifting track on the New Jersey side of the Delaware River Viaduct on June 8, 1984. Even as this was taking place, Morris County Transportation Department director Frank Reilly made last-ditch attempts to delay track removal in New Jersey. In addition, the dismantling was hampered by saboteurs who replaced railroad spikes removed by the crew.  These efforts proved to be in vain as the last mainline trackage was removed from the Cut-Off at Port Morris on October 5, 1984. Wooden ties and rock ballast were left in place, which was unusual since Conrail's standard abandonment practice involved removing all components (rails, wooden ties, signals, poles, rock ballast) when dismantling a railroad.

Turco said that he originally had no intention of purchasing the Cut-Off, but rather had learned of its availability from Conrail after he inquired about a 1,000-foot (300 m) section of the Lehigh & Hudson River Railway (L&HR) in Andover, an abandoned line that Conrail also owned. Turco said he wanted to acquire the short section so that he could expand a nursing home operation that abutted the roadbed. Turco said that it was during this time that Conrail offered the Cut-Off, which crosses the L&HR on the Pequest Fill near Tranquility, New Jersey, to create a package deal.

Shortly thereafter, Conrail sold the remaining  parcel east of Sussex County Road 602 to developer Burton Goldmeier of Hopatcong, who reportedly wanted to use that section of the Cut-Off as an access road to a proposed housing development. (Conrail would remove the tracks from the L&HR in 1988.)

Later preservation and restoration efforts (1986–2008)
With the rails gone and the right-of-way in the hands of private developers, things never seemed so bleak for the Cut-Off. Then they got worse when Turco announced plans to remove fill material from the Pequest Fill and other large Cut-Off fills for the Westway Project in New York City and to dump garbage and construction materials into the large cuts. The Westway Project was abandoned in September 1985, but there were other projects that Turco could have supplied fill material to, but as time went on Turco apparently saw greater opportunity elsewhere. As such, it was never entirely clear how serious Turco was about his proposed Rebar Landfill or if this was simply a ploy to stir up public opposition and force the New Jersey state government to step in and acquire the Cut-Off by condemnation. In any case, the proposal helped galvanize support for preserving the Cut-Off. 

 In November 1989, New Jersey citizens voted on a $25 million state bond issue for acquiring abandoned railroad rights-of-way. After they approved it overwhelmingly, NJDOT instituted eminent domain proceedings against the corporations that Turco and Goldmeier had established in New Jersey for the Cut-Off.

For liability purposes, Turco had established separate corporations for the parcels of right-of-way in each municipality that his section of the Cut-Off ran through: Knowlton, Blairstown and Frelinghuysen townships in Warren County; Green, Byram, and Andover townships and Stanhope and Andover boroughs in Sussex County. In addition to these corporations, Turco created holding companies to oversee these other corporations: Sussex & Warren Holding Company, Inc. and OLC, Inc., (OLC, Old Lackawanna Cut-Off). On the other hand, Goldmeier's  section of right-of-way, which passed through short sections of Roxbury Township (Port Morris and Landing) in Morris County and Hopatcong Borough and Byram Township in Sussex County, was held as one parcel.

By 2001, New Jersey and Pennsylvania had acquired their respective portions of the Cut-Off for a total of $21 million.  In 2003, U.S. Senator Arlen Specter (R-PA) secured initial funding for the restoration of passenger rail service between Scranton and New York City.

In July 2006, the final environmental review was submitted to the Federal Transit Administration for review and approval. The following February, the Lackawanna County and Monroe County Railroad Authorities were merged to form the Pennsylvania Northeast Regional Railroad Authority. One of the objectives of the new rail authority was to help expedite the effort to restore passenger service on the Scranton Corridor—that is, the tracks in Pennsylvania from the former Lackawanna Cut-Off to Scranton.

Port Morris–Andover restoration (2008–present)

In May 2008, the North Jersey Transportation Planning Authority (NJTPA) approved funding for Phase 1—also known as the Lackawanna Cut-Off MOS Trackbed Restoration Project, or Minimal Operating Segment, MOS—of the New Jersey Transit proposal to rebuild the first  of the Cut-Off between Port Morris Junction and Andover.

Eight eastbound and eight westbound trains to and from Hoboken Terminal and/or New York Penn Station would run on weekdays. No weekend service is planned. Additional non-revenue trains (deadhead moves) would run in each direction to move equipment to and from Port Morris Yard.

No DL&W station has previously existed at Andover.

It would also include work on the Roseville Tunnel, which has seen ice buildup within and drainage problems and rockslides just west of the tunnel bore. On April 13, 2022, the New Jersey Transit Board of Directors approved a $32.5 million plan to rehabilitate the tunnel and right-of-way to its east and west.

The 2008 approval made the project eligible for Federal Transit Administration (FTA) funding for engineering and design work. By 2009, the environmental assessment for the remainder of the project to Scranton was completed, with a "Finding of No Significant Impact" (FONSI) by the U.S. Environmental Protection Agency (EPA).

Full funding for the $61.6-million Phase 1 was reiterated by the New Jersey Transit Board of Directors on July 21, 2021: a federal earmark grant of $18.1 million plus funds from FTA and the New Jersey Transportation Trust Fund (NJTTF).

Project status
Brush removal and general preparation to restore trackage between Port Morris and Andover began in early 2011 after being delayed by a disagreement between the NJ-DEP and NJ Transit over the proposed location for Andover Station.  Separately, a small area of wetlands was found near County Route 605 in Stanhope where a stream passes along the north side of the right-of-way.  Federal regulations governing projects that receive federal funding forbid tree and brush removal from April 1 to October 31 due to the mating season of the endangered Indiana bat.

The laying of track began from Port Morris in September 2011.

Environmental permits were issued for the non-Roseville parts of the project in April 2015, and NJ Transit acquired 3.53 acres of wetlands mitigation credits to compensate for the loss of wetlands in building Andover Station. The pipe crossed land owned by the private Hudson Farm (which is owned by IAT Reinsurance Ltd.), which had initially refused to allow the work. This stalled Phase 1. However, on August 9, 2017, it was announced that a deal had been reached to move the culvert away from the property, and that the plan had been ratified by the New Jersey Transit Board of Directors. On April 9, 2018, the Andover Township Committee announced that it had reached a tentative agreement with Hudson Farm to buy the land on which the original culvert is located. On June 25, 2018, the Andover Township Committee agreed to pay Hudson Farm $115,000 for the land.

Most of the right-of-way between Port Morris Junction and the lake has been cleared of trees and debris. Since 2013, NJ Transit has been storing retired locomotives on a short section of the Cut-Off near Port Morris Junction.

From 2020 to 2022, NJ Transit qualified bidders for the Roseville Tunnel Rehabilitation Project, then awarded a $32.5 million contract to Schiavone Construction on April 13, 2022. NJ Transit issued a Notice to Proceed on September 8, 2022, and work began that month. Work on Roseville Tunnel will follow the culvert work. 

NJ Transit service to Andover is projected to begin in 2026.

Future phases 

Beyond Phase 1 (Port Morris Junction to Andover), there are no defined phases for future work. It is expected, however, that future phases would extend the line west of Andover to Delaware Water Gap, Scranton ( west of Port Morris), and possibly Binghamton, New York, based on funding availability.

Andover–Scranton

In May 2021, Amtrak proposed three round-trip trains per day between New York City and Scranton as part of its 15-year vision, estimating a 136-mile trip time of 3 hours 25 minutes.

In July 2021, Amtrak entered into an agreement to formally assess the infrastructure, ridership, and revenue of the route in collaboration with the Pennsylvania Northeast Regional Railroad Authority, with an approximate one-year timeline and $400,000 cost. Also in July, U.S. Representative Matt Cartwright, a Democrat who represented Pennsylvania's 8th District, announced the formation of a congressional Lackawanna Cut-Off Rail Restoration Caucus focused on completing the project. The founding members were Cartwright, Susan Wild of Pennsylvania's 7th District, Mikie Sherrill of New Jersey's 11th District, and Josh Gottheimer of New Jersey's 5th District.

The funds are half the required amount, and allow the authority to apply for the remaining dollars from the Federal Railroad Administration.

Scope of work and cost estimate

In 2007, the estimated cost of a full build-out to Scranton was $516 million 
($ today) with an annual operating cost of $26 million. This would include track, stations, signals, and bridgework on the Cut-Off; additional stations and signals in Pennsylvania; and additional locomotives and passenger cars dedicated to the route. No estimates for building and operating any intermediate phases were made at the time.

This full build-out to Scranton would include:
 In New Jersey:
 Rebuild the remainder of the Cut-Off (21 miles, 33 km) as a single-track railroad with a passing siding about 4 miles (6.5 km) east of Blairstown.
 Repair the Delaware River Viaduct.
 Repair the Paulinskill Viaduct.
 Reopen Blairstown Station with 230 parking spaces.
 Build a maintenance facility at the former Greendell station site. (Amtrak has not yet announced its intention to use this site.)
 In Pennsylvania:
 Replace the highway bridge at Slateford Junction (Slateford Road) that was removed in 1990.
 Build a station near the Delaware Water Gap Visitors' Center in Smithfield Township with a 900-parking space garage.(Amtrak's proposed service does not include a station at Delaware Water Gap.)
 Build a station in East Stroudsburg with 228 parking spaces.
 Build a station in Analomink with 250 parking spaces. (Amtrak's proposed service does not include a station at Analomink.)
 Build a Pocono Mountain station near the former Mount Pocono station with 1,000 parking spaces.
 Reopen the historic station building at Tobyhanna with 102 parking spaces.
 Build a station in Scranton west of the former DL&W station with 30 parking spaces, and build an overnight storage and maintenance yard for trainsets, as well as a facility for train crews.
 Upgrade the tracks in Pennsylvania.
 Install a signal system compatible with NJ Transit / Amtrak standards.

All stations would have high-level platforms and would comply with Americans with Disabilities Act (ADA) standards.  Service would be scheduled to Hoboken and New York City. By 2030, it is estimated that NJ Transit commuter service could transport 6,000 passengers a day to jobs in northern New Jersey and New York City.  Amtrak is expected to perform its own ridership estimates which would be based on both commuter and non-commuter (recreational and tourist) passenger volumes.

Andover–Delaware Water Gap

In October 2015, a study to update the 2007 data was requested by the FTA as a prerequisite for project funding west of Andover. The Lackawanna Cut-Off Restoration – Commuter Rail Study, released in December 2019, found that the capital costs for reactivating the railroad from Andover to a new station at Delaware Water Gap would be about $288.93 million. The figure, which included the cost of reinstalling about 21 miles of tracks, upgrading two major bridges, and other related work, is roughly half the 2006 estimate of $551 million, largely because it excludes building the new stations, maintenance facilities, and other upgrades included in the earlier study that involved work on the additional 55 miles (88.7 km) of railroad between the Delaware Water Gap and Scranton not covered within the scope of the study.

The 2019 study cost about $1 million, funded by local, state, and federal grants assembled by the office of U.S. Representative Matt Cartwright. It was prepared by Greenman-Pederson, Inc. of Scranton, PA (supported by sub-consultant Gannett-Fleming, Inc.) for the Pennsylvania Northeast Regional Railroad Authority and the Lackawanna County Department of Planning and Economic Development.

The scope of work included: assessments of the condition of the Paulinskill and Delaware River Viaducts; conceptual evaluation of a rail station and parking garage layout at Delaware Water Gap; a desk-top assessment of track geometry and rail operating speeds along the corridor; desk-top assessment of signaling and Positive Train Control needs in the corridor; assessments of the existing track, drainage and railroad bed condition in the corridor; conceptual layout of a bridge to carry Slateford Road over the restored passenger line; underwater inspection of the three river piers of the Delaware River Viaduct; and conceptual and updated cost estimates for the anticipated improvements.

The total conceptual construction costs for the project were preliminarily estimated to be $288,930,000. The individual cost elements were broken down as follows: Water Gap Rail Station ($32,630,000); right-of-way acquisition at the Delaware Water Gap Station ($1,500,000); Slateford Road Overhead Bridge construction and nearby culvert repairs ($3,320,000); signals and Positive Train Control ($8,190,000); track restoration in Pennsylvania (Delaware River Viaduct to Slateford Junction) ($16,610,000); track Restoration in New Jersey (Andover to Delaware River Viaduct) ($112,600,000); Delaware River Viaduct Rehabilitation ($54,000,000); Paulinskill Viaduct Rehabilitation ($16,000,000); and design, environmental and engineering costs ($44,080,000). The source of the funding for this scenario has not yet been identified.

As such, Amtrak's Vision document (May 27, 2021) does not include a station stop at Delaware Water Gap but extends service to Scranton, which was not within the scope of the Greenman-Pederson study.

Scranton–Binghamton

In December 2008, U.S. Senator Chuck Schumer, Democrat of New York, sent a letter to Amtrak president Joseph Boardman, expressing his support for Amtrak service between Scranton and Binghamton, New York. In April 2009, U.S. Senators Arlen Specter and Bob Casey, Jr., Democrats of Pennsylvania, sent a joint letter to President Barack Obama, seeking support for Amtrak service between the two cities. They also cited an Amtrak feasibility study on the subject.

Stations and landmarks (Port Morris–Scranton)

(* Miles from Hoboken, NJ.)

See also 
 North Jersey Rail Commuter Association, advocacy organization

References

External links
Official project website – New Jersey Transit
Map of project's route

NJ Transit Rail Operations
Lackawanna Cut-Off
Proposed railway lines in New Jersey
Proposed railway lines in Pennsylvania
Transportation in Sussex County, New Jersey
Transportation in Warren County, New Jersey
Transportation in Morris County, New Jersey
Railroad cutoffs
2026 in rail transport
Proposed Amtrak routes